Claudia Antoinette Zwiers (born 23 November 1973 in Haarlem, North Holland) is a judoka from the Netherlands, who represented her native country at two Summer Olympics (1996 and 2004). She won the bronze medal in the women's middleweight division (– 66 kg) in Atlanta, United States (1996).

References

External links
 
 
 Dutch Olympic Committee 

1973 births
Living people
Dutch female judoka
Judoka at the 1996 Summer Olympics
Judoka at the 2004 Summer Olympics
Olympic bronze medalists for the Netherlands
Olympic judoka of the Netherlands
Olympic medalists in judo
Sportspeople from Haarlem
Medalists at the 1996 Summer Olympics
Universiade medalists in judo
Universiade silver medalists for the Netherlands
20th-century Dutch women
21st-century Dutch women